The 2017 NorCA Women's Handball Championship was the second edition of the Nor.Ca. Women's Handball Championship. The tournament took place in Río Grande, Puerto Rico from 30 March to 3 April. It acts as the North American and Caribbean qualifying tournament for the 2017 Pan American Women's Handball Championship.

Participating teams

Preliminary round

All times are local (UTC−04:00).

Knockout stage

Bracket

Semifinals

Third place game

Final

Final standing

Awards
All-star team
Goalkeeper:  Sophie Fasold
Right Wing:  Yojaver Brito
Right Back:  Johanna Pimentel
Center Back:  Nathalys Ceballos
Left Back:  Lykke Hensen
Left Wing:  Zuleika Fuentes
Pivot:  Ciris García

References

External links
Championship page on PATHF Official Website
Results at todor66

Nor.Ca. Women's Handball Championship
Nor.Ca Women's Handball Championship
Río Grande, Puerto Rico
2017 in Puerto Rican sports
International sports competitions hosted by Puerto Rico
March 2017 sports events in North America